The 2013 PLSQ season was the second season of existence for the Première ligue de soccer du Québec, a Division 3 men's semi-professional soccer league and the highest level of soccer fully contained within the province of Québec.  It is below Major League Soccer and the North American Soccer League in the Canadian soccer league system.

FC Saint-Léonard were the defending champions from 2012.

CS Mont-Royal Outremont won the 2013 league championship as well as the inaugural League Cup.

Teams
The 2013 season was contested between seven teams. CS Mont-Royal Outremont and FC Gatineau joined the league.

Season standings

Top scorers

Awards

League Cup
The PLSQ debuted their League Cup this season, which took place following the end of the season. The top six teams from the league season were divided into two groups (the seventh place club - FC Boisbriand - did not qualify). Each team would play the other two teams in the group, with the first place finisher in each group advancing to the finals.
CS Mont-Royal Outremont won the League Cup defeating FC Brossard 2-0 in the finals.

Group stage 
Group A

Group B

Championship Match

References

External links

Premiere
Première ligue de soccer du Québec seasons